The Turkish Volleyball Federation (TVF) (in Turkish: Türkiye Voleybol Federasyonu) is the governing body of volleyball and beach volleyball in Turkey. Formed in 1958, it is based in Ankara. The TVF is a member of the International Volleyball Federation (FIVB) and the European Volleyball Confederation (CEV). Federation's president is Mehmet Akif Ustundag since November 21, 2016.

Volleyball

Competitions

National
The federation organizes three volleyball leagues and one Turkey cup for men's and women's teams each.

Men’s leagues
 Acıbadem Men's Volleyball League (12 teams)
 Men's Volleyball Second  League (24 teams in two groups)
 Men's Volleyball Third League (36 teams in four groups)
 Junior Men's Volleyball League

Men’s cups
 Teledünya Men's Volleyball Cup
 Men's Super Cup

Women’s leagues
 Acıbadem Women's Volleyball League (12 teams)
 Women's Volleyball Second League (24 teams in two groups)
 Women's Volleyball Third League (36 teams in four groups)
 Junior Women's Volleyball League

Women’s cups
 Teledünya Women's Volleyball Cup
 Women's Super Cup

International
Turkish clubs and national teams participate after qualification at the Olympics, Mediterranean Games, Balkan Games as well as world and European events of following competitions:

Men's
National teams
Men's
 Men's European Volleyball Championship - Hosted: (1967, 2009)
 Men's European Volleyball League - Hosted: (2006, 2008, 2012, 2013)
 (2012)
 (2008, 2010)
Men's Junior
 Men's Junior European Volleyball Championship - Hosted: (1994)
Boys' Youth
 Boys' Youth European Volleyball Championship

Clubs
 CEV Men's Champions League
 (1979-80 Eczacıbaşı)
 (2013-14 Halkbank)
 Men's CEV Cup
 (2012-13 Halkbank)
 Men's Challenge Cup
 (2008-09 Arkas, 2013-14 Fenerbahçe Grundig)
 (1996-97 Netaş, 2010-11 Arkas)

Women's
National teams
Women's
 FIVB Women's Volleyball World Championship
 FIVB World Grand Prix
 (2012)
 Women's European Volleyball Championship - Hosted: (1967, 2003)
 (2003),
 (2011)
 European Volleyball League - Hosted: (2009, 2010, 2011)
 (2009, 2011)
 (2010)
Women's Junior
 Women's Junior European Volleyball Championship - Hosted: (1996, 2012)
 (2012)
 (2008)
Girls' Youth
 Girls Youth Volleyball World Championship - Hosted: (2011)
 (2011)
 (2007)
 Girls' Youth European Volleyball Championship - Hosted: (2011)
 (2011)
 (2013)
 European Youth Olympic Festival
 (2009)
 (2007, 2011)
Clubs
 FIVB Volleyball Women's Club World Championship
 (2010 Fenerbahçe, 2013 Vakıfbank, 2015 Eczacıbaşı)
 (2011 Vakıfbank)
 (2012 Fenerbahçe)
 CEV Women's Champions League
 (2010-11 Vakıfbank, 2011-12 Fenerbahçe, 2012-13 Vakıfbank, 2014-15 Eczacıbaşı)
 (1979-80 Eczacıbaşı, 1997-98 Vakıfbank, 1998-99 Vakıfbank, 2009-10 Fenerbahçe, 2013-14 Vakıfbank)
 (1999-20 Eczacıbaşı, 2010-11 Fenerbahçe, 2014-15 Vakıfbank) 
 Women's CEV Cup
 (1998-99 Eczacıbaşı, 2003-04 Vakıfbank, 2013-14 Fenerbahçe)
 (2011-12 Galatasaray, 2012-13 Fenerbahçe, 2015-16 Galatasaray)
 Women's Challenge Cup 
 (2007-08 Vakıfbank, 2014-15 Bursa BBSK)
 (1992-93 Eczacıbaşı, 1995-96 Emlakbank, 2013-2014 Beşiktaş, 2015-16 Trabzon İdmanocağı)
 Değer Eraybar Tournament:* Top Volley Tournament

National teams
The federation forms the men's and women's national teams, which take part at international events.
Turkey men's team
Turkey men's U19 team
Turkey men's U21 team
Turkey men's U23 team
Turkey women's team
Turkey women's U18 team
Turkey women's U20 team
Turkey women's U23 team

Beach volleyball

Competitions
 Men's Beach Volleyball League (8 teams)
 Women's Beach Volleyball League (5 teams)

Facilities
The federation owns volleyball venues TVF 50th Anniversary Sport Hall and TVF Burhan Felek Sport Hall in Üsküdar, Istanbul and Başkent Volleyball Hall in Yenimahalle, Ankara.

In 2009, it established TVF Fine Arts and Sports High School in Ankara, dedicated to raise talented youth to sportspeople particularly in volleyball.

References

External links
 Turkish Volleyball Federation official website 

National members of the European Volleyball Confederation
Volleyball
Sports organizations established in 1958
Federation
Organizations based in Ankara
1958 establishments in Turkey